Consumer spending is the total money spent on final goods and services by individuals and households.

There are two components of consumer spending: induced consumption (which is affected by the level of income) and autonomous consumption (which is not).

Macroeconomic factors

Taxes
Taxes are a tool in the adjustment of the economy. Tax policies designed by governments affect consumer groups, net consumer spending and consumer confidence. Economists expect tax manipulation to increase or decrease consumer spending, though the precise impact of specific manipulations are often the subject of controversy.

Underlying tax manipulation as a stimulant or suppression of consumer spending is an equation for gross domestic product (GDP). The equation is GDP = C + I + G + NX, where C is private consumption, I is private investment, G is government and NX is the net of exports minus imports.  Increases in government spending create demand and economic expansion.  However, government spending increases translates to tax increases or deficit spending. This creates a potential negative impact on private consumption, investment, and/or the balance of trade.

Consumer sentiment
Consumer sentiment is the general attitude of  toward the economy and the health of the fiscal markets, and they are a strong constituent of consumer spending.  Sentiments have a powerful ability to cause fluctuations in the economy, because if the attitude of the consumer regarding the state of the economy is bad, then they will be reluctant to spend.  Therefore, sentiments prove to be a powerful predictor of the economy, because when people have faith in the economy or in what they believe will soon occur, they will spend and invest with confidence.  However sentiments do not always affect the spending habits of some people as much as they do for others.  For example, some households set their spending strictly off of their income, so that their income closely equals, or nearly equals their consumption (including savings).  Others rely on their sentiments to dictate how they spend their income and such.

Government economic stimulus
In times of economic trouble or uncertainty, the government often tries to rectify the issue by distributing economic stimuli, often in the form of rebates or checks.  However such techniques have failed in the past for several reasons.  As was discussed earlier, temporary financial reprieve rarely succeeds because people do not often like rapidly shifting their spending habits.  Also, people are many times intelligent enough to realize that economic stimulus packages are due to economic downturns, and therefore they are even more reluctant to spend them.  Instead they put them into savings, which can potentially also help spur the economy.  By putting money into savings, banks profit and are able to decrease the interest rates, which then encourage others to save less and promote future spending.

Fuel
When fuel supplies are disrupted, the demand for goods that are dependent on fuel, like motor vehicles and machinery, may decrease.  Disruption in energy supplies creates uncertainty regarding availability and upcoming prices of these supplies.  Often, consumers will not purchase energy-dependent products until they can be sure that fuel will be available to use the product.

Increases in the price of fuel do not lead to decreases in demand because it is inelastic. Rather, a greater portion of income is spent on fuel, and less is available to purchase other goods. This leads to an overall decrease in consumer spending.

Data

United States

In 1929, consumer spending was 75% of the nation's economy. This grew to 83% in 1932, when business spending dropped. Consumer spending dropped to about 50% during World War II due to large expenditures by the government and lack of consumer products. Consumer spending in the US rose from about 62% of GDP in 1960, where it stayed until about 1981, and has since risen to 71% in 2013.

In the United States, the Consumer Spending figure published by the Bureau of Economic Analysis includes three broad categories of personal spending.
 Durable goods: motor vehicles and parts, furnishings and durable household equipment, recreational goods and vehicles, and other durable goods.
 Nondurable goods: food and beverages purchased for off-premises consumption, clothing and footwear, gasoline and other energy goods, and other nondurable goods.
 Services: housing and utilities, healthcare, transportation services, recreation services, food services and accommodations, financial services and insurance, and other services.

For U.S. domestic consumer spending by population and income demographics collected by the U.S Census Bureau at the household level and analyzed and published by the Bureau of Labor Statistics, see the link at BLS.gov/CEX

See also
 Consumer Expenditure Survey
 List of largest consumer markets

References

Consumption (macroeconomics)